Wilmerv Clarence Fleming (September 30, 1901 – March 13, 1969) was a professional football player who spent a year in the National Football League with the Canton Bulldogs in 1925. Prior to joining the NFL, Fleming played college football at Mount Union College, located in Alliance, Ohio.

Notes

1901 births
1969 deaths
Players of American football from Ohio
People from Cambridge, Ohio
Canton Bulldogs players
Mount Union Purple Raiders football players